Megan Williams (11 September 195617 April 2000) was an Australian actress and singer, who played a continuing role as Alice Sullivan in the television drama The Sullivans, and won a Logie Award for her work in Anzacs (1985).

Early years
Williams was born in London, England to David and Chin Yu Williams who appeared in a West End production of South Pacific. At six months old, Williams had a minor TV role as an abandoned baby on The Adventures of Robin Hood. Williams' family moved to Sydney, Australia where she pursued an acting career.

Career

Actor
Williams' first major role was as an ongoing lead, Ann Watson, in the daily soap opera Class of '74 (1974). The long running role of Alice Watkins Sullivan in The Sullivans (1978-1982) followed. A guest role as Carol Canning in The Outsiders (1976) episode 10 "Charlie Cole Esq." (broadcast 1977) had her appearing in a bikini. After The Sullivans ended she continued to act on Australian television, with a guest role in ABC drama-musical series Sweet and Sour (1984), a Logie Award winning role as Kate Baker in the miniseries Anzacs (1985), and an ongoing role of Cassie Jones in Return to Eden (1986). In the late 1980s she worked in the UK, appearing in one episode of British soap opera EastEnders (1989). Williams had a minor role in the movie Nightmare Man (1999).
Williams also appeared in an Australian production of "Cats" as Grizzabella.
She also appeared in the Australian comedy series All Together Now, which starred Jon English, as an electrician called Julie in the episode titled: I've Got to Be Me (Season 3 - Episode 3).

FILM

TELEVISION
{| class="wikitable"
|-
! Year
! Program
! Character
! Type
|-
| 1957
| The Adventures of Robin Hood
| Molly
| TV series UK
|-
| 1974-1975
| Class of '74
| Ann Watson
| TV series, Regular role
|-
| 1975
| Class of '75
| Ann Watson
| TV series, Regular role
|-
| 1975
| Division 4
| Barbie Carson
| TV series, 1 episode
|-
| 1976
| The Outsiders
| Carol Canning
| ABC TV series, 1 episode
|-
| 1977
| Graham Kennedy's Blankety Blanks
| Herself
| TV series, 2 episodes
|-
| 1977
| All At Sea
| Maryanne Hand
| TV movie
|-
| 1978-1983
| The Sullivans
| Alice Watkins Sullivan / Alice Morgan
| TV series, 729 episodes
|-
| 1981
| The Don Lane Show
| Herself
| TV series, 1 episode
|-
| 1982
| The Daryl Somers Show
| Herself
| TV series, 1 episode
|-
| 1984
| Supersleuth
| Roberta Collins
| TV movie
|-
| 1984
| Sweet and Sour
| Charlie
| ABC TV series, 4 episodes
|-
| 1985
| The Midday Show
| Grizabella ('Cats')
| TV series, 2 episodes
|-
| 1985
| Anzacs
| Sister Kate Baker
| TV miniseries, 5 episodes
|-
| 1985
| Making Of 'Anzacs'''
| Herself / Sister Kate Baker
| TV special
|-
| 1986
| Return To Eden| Cassie Jones
| TV series, 22 episodes
|-
| 1989
| EastEnders| Nancy
| TV series UK, 1 episode
|-
| 1990
| TV Celebrity Dance Party| Herself performs "Do You Wanna Dance"
| TV special
|-
| 1991
| Tonight Live With Steve Vizard| Herself
| TV series, 1 episode
|-
| 1991
| The Midday Show| Herself
| TV series, 1 episode
|-
| 1991
| Lethal Impact| Chris' doctor
| Video UK
|-
| 1992
| Great Performances| French / Party Guests / Snow Flowers
| TV series US
|-
| 1992
| The Morning Show| Herself
| TV series, 1 episode
|-
| 1992
| In Sydney Today| Herself
| TV series, 1 episode
|-
| 1992
| All Together Now| Julie
| TV series, 1 episode
|-
| 1992
| The World Tonight: Beauty And The Beast segment| Herself
| TV series, 1 episode
|-
| 1996
| In Suspicious Circumstances| Georgina Moore
| TV series UK
|}

Singer
Megan Williams also appeared in the Film Clip of "The Queen and Me" with Mondo Rock (1982). Williams provided backing vocals for "Flame Trees" on Cold Chisel's Twentieth Century (1984). John Prior (drummer with Matt Finish) wrote songs for Williams in the mid-1980s.

Pilates teacher
Williams was instrumental in bringing Pilates to Australia, as she was doing exercise/rehab for Sydney Dance Company and others. She was one of the founders of The Australian Pilates Method Association.

Personal life
Williams was in a de facto'' relationship with Cold Chisel singer-guitarist Ian Moss for 11 years, before they separated in the 1990s.

Williams had an operation for breast cancer in 1997, however the disease was diagnosed again in December 1999 and she died at Darlinghurst Sacred Heart Hospice in April 2000, aged 43.

References

External links

1956 births
2000 deaths
20th-century British actresses
British emigrants to Australia
Australian people of Chinese descent
Australian people of English descent
Australian soap opera actresses
Deaths from breast cancer
Deaths from cancer in New South Wales
Logie Award winners
20th-century Australian women singers
Australian actresses of Asian descent